Typothoracinae is a clade of aetosaurs within the subfamily Aetosaurinae. It was originally defined as a stem-based taxon including all aetosaurs closer to Typothorax than to Stagonolepis or Desmatosuchus. This definition was later expanded to specifically exclude Aetosaurus; as of 2016, Typothoracinae is defined as the least inclusive clade containing Typothorax and Paratypothorax, but not Aetosaurus, Stagonolepis, or Desmatosuchus. The clade was first named in 2007 under the spelling Typothoracisinae, after its namesake Typothorax. However, this spelling was based on incorrect taxonomic nomenclature, and the clade's name was corrected to Typothoracinae in 2016.

Typothoracines can be distinguished by their wide bodies. The transverse processes of the dorsal (trunk) vertebrae are reinforced and elongated, more than twice the width of the centrum. Their neural spines, on the other hand, are short. The overlying carapace of osteoderms has a very broad, discoidal shape, distinct from the narrower carapace seen in other aetosaurs. The widest dorsal paramedian osteoderms have a width-to-length ratio exceeding 3.5. They also tend to possess a strong keel running along their underside, as well as a sigmoid lateral edge which appears to have a "clipped" posterolateral corner.

Though typothoracines lack the massive neck spines of certain desmatosuchines, their cervical (neck) lateral osteoderms do bear moderately large curved spines with a flattened cross section. The dorsal lateral osteoderms have a strongly bent shape: there is an acute angle of flexion between the dorsal (upper) flange and the lateral (outer and lower) flange, which meet along a low blade-like surface or short spine on the outer edge of the osteoderm. In the lateral osteoderms above the hip and the front part of the tail, the lateral flange is triangular and concave, leading up to a hooked eminence.

References

Aetosaurs
Late Triassic first appearances
Late Triassic extinctions